General elections were held in Tunisia on 20 March 1994 to elect a President and Chamber of Deputies. In the presidential election, incumbent Zine El Abidine Ben Ali was re-elected unopposed for a second five-year term; he was the only candidate to get endorsements from 30 political figures, as required by the Constitution.  In the Chamber election, Ben Ali's Constitutional Democratic Rally won 144 seats in an expanded 163-seat Chamber with 97.1 percent of the vote; six other parties received two percent of the vote between them with four winning seats. It was the first time since Tunisia gained independence that the RCD would face any opposition MPs.  Voter turnout was 95.47%.

Results

President

Chamber of Deputies

References

Tunisia
Elections in Tunisia
1994 in Tunisia
Presidential elections in Tunisia
March 1994 events in Africa